Hypericum pseudohenryi, called the Irish tutsan, is a species of flowering plant in the family Hypericaceae, endemic to China. The species has been awarded the Royal Horticultural Society's Award of Garden Merit. It is invasive in South Africa.

References

pseudohenryi
Endemic flora of China